Nikolay Ivanovich Bobrikov (in St. Petersburg –  in Helsinki, Grand Duchy of Finland) was a Russian general and politician. He was the Governor-General of Finland and the Finnish Military District from  until his death, during the early reign of Emperor Nicholas II, and was responsible for the Russification of Finland. After appointment as the governor-general, he quickly became very unpopular and was assassinated by Eugen Schauman, a Finnish nationalist born in Kharkiv.

Biography

Early life
Nikolay Ivanovich Bobrikov was born on January 15, 1839, and attended the 1st Cadet Corps. Upon graduation, he became a lieutenant and served in the Imperial Guards. After which he served in the Kazan military district and as divisional chief-of-staff in Novgorod. He became a colonel in 1869. A year later he was transferred to Saint Petersburg for special duties in the Imperial guard. This gave Bobrikov access to the Imperial court. In 1878 he became a major general.

Governor-General of Finland
In 1898, Tsar Nicholas II appointed Bobrikov as the Governor-General of Finland as well as the Finnish Military District.

Upon appointment, he introduced a Russification programme into the Grand Duchy, the 11 main points were:

 Unification of the Finnish army.
 Restricting the power of the Minister–Secretary of the State.
 Introducing of a special programme for dealing with cases common to the Empire and the Grand Duchy.
 Adoption of the Russian language as the official language of the Senate, education and administration.

Bobrikov quickly became very unpopular and hated in Finland as he was an adamant supporter of the curtailing of the grand principality's extensive autonomy, which had in the late 1800s come into conflict with Russian ambitions of a unified and indivisible Russian state. In 1899, Nicholas II signed the "February Manifesto" which marks the beginning of the first "Years of Oppression" from the traditional Finnish perspective. In this manifesto the Tsar decreed that the Diet of the Estates of Finland could be overruled in legislation if it was in Russian imperial interests. Half a million Finns, considering the decree a coup against the Finnish constitution, signed a petition to Nicholas II requesting to revoke the manifesto. The Tsar didn't even receive the delegation bringing the petition.

In 1900, Bobrikov issued orders that all correspondence between government offices was to be conducted in Russian and that education in the Russian language was to be increased in schools. The Finnish army was abolished in 1901, and Finnish conscripts could now be forced to serve with Russian troops anywhere in the Russian empire. To the first call-up in 1902, only 42% of the conscripts showed up. In 1905, conscription in Finland was abolished since Finns were seen as unreliable. In 1903, Bobrikov was given dictatorial powers by the Tsar so that he could dismiss government officials and close newspapers.

Assassination

On June 16, 1904, Bobrikov was assassinated by Eugen Schauman in Helsinki. Schauman shot Bobrikov three times and then himself twice. Schauman died instantly, while Bobrikov, mortally wounded, died at the hospital in the early hours of the following morning. It was described as the following (Old Style dates):

Honours and awards

Domestic
 Order of St. Anna, 3rd class (14.4.1865)
 Order of St. Stanislaus, 2nd class 
 Order of St. Anna, 2nd class with Imperial Crown (17.11.1869, Imperial Crown on 30.8.1873)
 Order of St. Vladimir, 4th class (30.8.1871)
 Order of St. Vladimir, 3rd class (30.8.1875)
 Order of St. Stanislaus, 1st class (30.8.1878)
 Order of St. Anna, 1st class (30.8.1880)
 Order of St. Vladimir, 2nd class (15.5.1883)
 Order of the White Eagle (30.8.1887)
 Order of St. Alexander Nevsky with diamonds signs (30.8.1891, diamond sign on 14.5.1896)
 Order of St. Vladimir, 1st class (1.1.1902)

References

Further reading

 
 
 

|-

1839 births
1904 deaths
Military personnel from Saint Petersburg
People from Petergofsky Uyezd
Politicians of the Russian Empire
Members of the State Council (Russian Empire)
Governors of the Grand Duchy of Finland
Russification
Recipients of the Order of the White Eagle (Russia)
Recipients of the Order of Saint Stanislaus (Russian)
Assassinated politicians of the Russian Empire
Deaths by firearm in Finland
People murdered in Finland